Raherki, also spelled Rahirki, is a village in the Sindh province of Pakistan. The Mahi Wah river runs through the centre of the village.

It's a fast-growing town with good literacy rate and improving infrastructure. Pooj Shree Raherki Saahib is known as the birthplace of Sant Satram Das. Thousands of pilgrims from all over the world come to see the Devri (shrine) of the saint, and devotees celebrate his birthday in October each year.

Various Sindhu tribes such as Rid, Rahar, Rathore, Sameja, Kobhar Kumbhar, Khatri, Bhaya, Bhatti, and Dhondhu also live in this village. Muslims and Hindus live together in peace and harmony. 

Engro Chemical Pakistan Ltd, which is one of the largest manufacturer of chemical fertilizer in Pakistan is situated within the jurisdiction of Union Council Raharki. Though Raharki is one of the fastest-growing villages of Sindh province, the residents are deprived of basic health and civic facilities.

Climate 
The climate of Chak is hot and misty during summer while cold and dry in winter. Generally the summer season commences in March - April and ends before October.

Economy 
Most of the villagers earn their livelihood from agriculture. There is an increasing trend in the private shops and government jobs.

Education 

The following are the educational institutions in Raharki.

Government Branch High School, Raharki
Government Primary School, Raharki

Religion
Hindu temples:
 Raharki Sahib at Raharki
The temple situated in Raharki is regarded as one of the biggest temples in Pakistan and is visited by thousands of devotees from all over the world.

See also 
 Daharki
 Sukkur
 Ghotki
 Sindhi people

References

External links 
http://www.sachosatram.com
http://www.bhagatkanwarram.com

Villages in Sindh